The fifth competition weekend of the 2015–16 ISU Speed Skating World Cup was held in the Sørmarka Arena in Stavanger, Norway, from Friday, 29 January, until Sunday, 31 January 2016.

Schedule
The detailed schedule of events:

All times are CET (UTC+1).

Medal summary

Men's events

Women's events

References

 
5
Isu World Cup, 2015-16, 5
Sport in Stavanger